Oscar Lee Owens (February 21, 1877 – October 25, 1954) was an American college football coach and educator. He was the ninth head football coach at Richmond College—now known as the University of Richmond—in Richmond, Virginia, serving for one season, in 1898, and compiling record of 3–3–1.

A native of Windsor, Virginia, Owens attended Richmond College and George Washington University. He later lived in Baltimore, Maryland and earned a doctorate at Johns Hopkins University. Owens served in the United States Army during World War I. He moved to Oklahoma in 1936 and spent ten years as head of the history department at Oklahoma City University. Owens later worked a counselor for the Oklahoma State employment service. He died on October 25, 1954.

Head coaching record

References

External links
 

1877 births
1954 deaths
20th-century American educators
20th-century American historians
Richmond Spiders football coaches
George Washington University alumni
Johns Hopkins University alumni
Oklahoma City University faculty
University of Richmond alumni
United States Army officers
United States Army personnel of World War I
Sportspeople from Suffolk, Virginia
People from Isle of Wight County, Virginia
People from Nansemond County, Virginia
Coaches of American football from Virginia
Military personnel from Virginia